The 9th Academy Awards were held on March 4, 1937, at the Biltmore Hotel in Los Angeles, California to honor films released in 1936. They were hosted by George Jessel, with music by the Victor Young Orchestra, with Spike Jones on drums. This year marked the introduction of the Best Supporting Actor and Best Supporting Actress categories, and was the first year that the awards for directing and acting were fixed at five nominees per category.

My Man Godfrey became the first film to receive nominations in all four acting categories, but did not win in any category. It is the only such film to not receive a nomination for Best Picture, and was the only one to lose all of its nominations until Sunset Boulevard at the 23rd Academy Awards and American Hustle at the 86th. It was also the first of four films to receive four acting nominations without one for Best Picture, followed by I Remember Mama (1948), Othello (1965), and Doubt (2008).

Winners and nominees 

Nominees were announced on February 7, 1937. Winners are listed first and highlighted in boldface.

Academy Honorary Awards 

 W. Howard Greene and Harold Rosson "for the color cinematography of the Selznick International Production, The Garden of Allah".
 The March of Time "for its significance to motion pictures and for having revolutionized one of the most important branches of the industry – the newsreel".

Multiple nominations and awards 

The following twenty films received multiple nominations:

 7 nominations: Anthony Adverse, Dodsworth and The Great Ziegfeld
 6 nominations: My Man Godfrey and San Francisco 
 5 nominations: Mr. Deeds Goes to Town
 4 nominations: Romeo and Juliet and The Story of Louis Pasteur
 3 nominations: The Charge of the Light Brigade, The General Died at Dawn and Three Smart Girls
 2 nominations: Born to Dance, Come and Get It, The Garden of Allah, The Gorgeous Hussy, Lloyd's of London, Swing Time, A Tale of Two Cities, Theodora Goes Wild and Winterset

The following three films received multiple awards:

 4 awards: Anthony Adverse
 3 awards: The Great Ziegfeld and The Story of Louis Pasteur

See also 

 1936 in film
 List of films with all four Academy Award acting nominations

References

Academy Awards ceremonies
1936 film awards
1937 in Los Angeles
1937 in American cinema
March 1937 events